Lafayette Ronald Hubbard (March 13, 1911 – January 24, 1986) was an American author, primarily of science fiction and fantasy stories, who is best known for having founded the Church of Scientology. In 1950, Hubbard authored Dianetics: The Modern Science of Mental Health and established a series of organizations to promote Dianetics. In 1952, Hubbard lost the rights to Dianetics in bankruptcy proceedings, and he subsequently founded Scientology. Thereafter, Hubbard oversaw the growth of the Church of Scientology into a worldwide organization.

Born in Tilden, Nebraska, in 1911, Hubbard spent much of his childhood in Helena, Montana. After his father was posted to the U.S. naval base on Guam, Hubbard traveled to Asia and the South Pacific in the late 1920s. In 1930, Hubbard enrolled at George Washington University to study civil engineering but dropped out in his second year. He began his career as a prolific writer of pulp fiction stories and married Margaret "Polly" Grubb, who shared his interest in aviation.

Hubbard was an officer in the Navy during World War II, where he briefly commanded two ships but was removed from command both times. The last few months of his active service were spent in a hospital, being treated for a variety of complaints.

In 1953, the first churches of Scientology were founded by L. Ron Hubbard, and in 1954 a Scientology church in Los Angeles was founded, which became the Church of Scientology International. Hubbard also added organizational management strategies, principles of pedagogy, a theory of communication and prevention strategies for healthy living to the teachings of Scientology.

Scientology became increasingly controversial during the 1960s and came under intense media, government and legal pressure in a number of countries. During the late 1960s and early 1970s, Hubbard spent much of his time at sea on his personal fleet of ships as "Commodore" of the Sea Organization, an elite quasi-paramilitary group of Scientologists.

Hubbard returned to the United States in 1975 and went into seclusion in the California desert after an unsuccessful attempt to take over the town of Clearwater, Florida. In 1978, Hubbard was convicted of fraud after he was tried in absentia by France. In the same year, eleven high-ranking members of Scientology were indicted on 28 charges for their role in the Church's Snow White Program, a systematic program of espionage against the United States government. One of the indicted was Hubbard's wife Mary Sue Hubbard, who was in charge of the program; L. Ron Hubbard was named an unindicted co-conspirator.

Hubbard spent the remaining years of his life in seclusion in a luxury motorhome on a ranch in California, attended to by a small group of Scientology officials. He died at age 74 in January 1986. Following Hubbard's death, Scientology leaders announced that his body had become an impediment to his work and that he had decided to "drop his body" to continue his research on another plane of existence. Though many of Hubbard's autobiographical statements have been found to be fictitious, the Church of Scientology describes Hubbard in hagiographic terms and rejects any suggestion that its account of Hubbard's life is not historical fact.

Early life

L. Ron Hubbard was born in 1911 in Tilden, Nebraska, the only child of Ledora May (née Waterbury), who had trained as a teacher, and Harry Ross Hubbard, a former United States Navy officer. After moving to Kalispell, Montana, they settled in Helena in 1913. Hubbard's father rejoined the Navy in April 1917, during World War I, while his mother worked as a clerk for the state government.

During the 1920s the Hubbards repeatedly relocated around the United States and overseas. Hubbard was active in the Boy Scouts in Washington, D.C. and earned the rank of Eagle Scout in 1924, two weeks after his 13th birthday.

In 1925, Hubbard was enrolled as a freshman at Union High School, Bremerton, and the following year studied at Queen Anne High School in Seattle.

In April 1927, Hubbard's father was posted to Guam, and that summer, Hubbard and his mother traveled to Guam with a brief stop-over in a couple of Chinese ports. He recorded his impressions of the places he visited and disdained the poverty of the inhabitants of Japan and China, whom he described as "gooks" and "lazy [and] ignorant".

In September 1927, while living with grandparents, Hubbard enrolled at Helena High School, where he contributed to the school paper. On May 11, 1928, Hubbard was dropped from enrollment at Helena High due to failing grades. Hubbard left Helena and rejoined his parents in Guam in June 1928.

Between October and December 1928, Hubbard's family and others traveled from Guam to China. Upon his return to Guam, Hubbard spent much of his time writing dozens of short stories and essays. Hubbard failed the Naval Academy entrance examination.

In September 1929, Hubbard was enrolled at the Swavely Preparatory School in Manassas, Virginia, to prepare him for a second attempt at the examination. During his first semester at Swevely, Hubbard complained of eye strain and was diagnosed with myopia; this diagnosis precluded any enrollment in the Naval Academy. As an adult, Hubbard would write to himself: "Your eyes are getting progressively better. They became bad when you used them as an excuse to escape the naval academy".

He was instead sent to Woodward School for Boys in Washington, D.C. to qualify for admission to George Washington University without having to sit for the entrance examination. He successfully graduated from the school in June 1930 and entered the University the following September.

Period at university and Caribbean trip
On September 24, 1930, Hubbard began studying civil engineering at George Washington University's School of Engineering, at the behest of his father. Academically, Hubbard did poorly: his transcripts show he failed many courses including atomic physics, though later in life he would claim to have been a nuclear physicist. In September 1931, he was placed on probation due to poor grades, and in April 1932 he again received a warning for his lack of academic achievement. During his first year, Hubbard helped organize the university Glider Club and was elected its president.

During what would become Hubbard's final semester at GWU, he organized an ill-fated trip to the Caribbean for June 1932 to explore and film the pirate "strongholds and bivouacs of the Spanish Main" and to "collect whatever one collects for exhibits in museums". Amid multiple misfortunes and running low on funds, the ship's owners ordered it to return to Baltimore. Hubbard failed to return to University the following year.

After his father volunteered him for a Red Cross relief effort, on October 23, 1932, Hubbard traveled to Puerto Rico. En route, Hubbard apparently "decided to abandon the Red Cross", instead opting to accompany a mineral surveyor in a futile bid to find gold.

First marriage and early literary career

Hubbard returned from Puerto Rico to D.C. in February 1933. He struck up a relationship with a fellow glider pilot named Margaret "Polly" Grubb. The two were married on April 13. She was already pregnant when they married, but had a miscarriage shortly afterwards; a few months later, she became pregnant again. On May 7, 1934, she gave birth prematurely to a son who was named Lafayette Ronald Hubbard, Jr., whose nickname was "Nibs". Their second child, Katherine May, was born on January 15, 1936. The Hubbards lived for a while in Laytonsville, Maryland, but were chronically short of money.

Hubbard became a well-known and prolific writer for pulp fiction magazines during the 1930s. His literary career began with contributions to the George Washington University student newspaper, The University Hatchet, as a reporter for a few months in 1931. Six of his pieces were published commercially during 1932 to 1933. The going rate for freelance writers at the time was only a cent a word, so Hubbard's total earnings from these articles would have been less than $100. The pulp magazine Thrilling Adventures became the first to publish one of his short stories, in February 1934. Over the next six years, pulp magazines published many of his short stories under a variety of pen names, including Winchester Remington Colt, Kurt von Rachen, René Lafayette, Joe Blitz and Legionnaire 148.

Although he was best known for his fantasy and science fiction stories, Hubbard wrote in a wide variety of genres, including adventure fiction, aviation, travel, mysteries, westerns and even romance. Hubbard knew and associated with writers such as Isaac Asimov, Arthur J. Burks, Robert A. Heinlein, L. Sprague de Camp and A. E. van Vogt.

In the spring of 1936 they moved to Bremerton, Washington. They lived there for a time with Hubbard's aunts and grandmother before finding a place of their own at nearby South Colby. According to one of his friends at the time, Robert MacDonald Ford, the Hubbards were "in fairly dire straits for money" but sustained themselves on the income from Hubbard's writing.

His first full-length novel, Buckskin Brigades, was published in 1937. He became a "highly idiosyncratic" writer of science fiction after being taken under the wing of editor John W. Campbell, who published many of Hubbard's short stories and also serialized a number of well-received novelettes that Hubbard wrote for Campbell's magazines Unknown and Astounding Science Fiction. These included Fear, Final Blackout and Typewriter in the Sky.

He wrote the script for The Secret of Treasure Island, a 1938 Columbia Pictures movie serial.

Hubbard spent an increasing amount of time in New York City, working out of a hotel room where his wife suspected him of carrying on affairs with other women.

Dental procedure, near-death experience, and Excalibur

In April 1938, Hubbard reportedly underwent a dental procedure and reacted to the drug used in the procedure. According to his account, this triggered a revelatory near-death experience. Allegedly inspired by this experience, Hubbard composed a manuscript, which was never published, with working titles of The One Command or Excalibur.

Arthur J. Burks, who read the work in 1938, later recalled it discussed the "one command": to survive. This theme would be revisited in Dianetics. Burks also recalled the work discussing the psychology of a lynch mob. Hubbard would later cite Excalibur as an early version of Dianetics.

According to Burks, Hubbard believed that Excalibur would "revolutionize everything" and that "it was somewhat more important, and would have a greater impact upon people, than the Bible." According to Burks, Hubbard "was so sure he had something 'away out and beyond' anything else that he had sent telegrams to several book publishers, telling them that he had written 'THE book' and that they were to meet him at Penn Station, and he would discuss it with them and go with whomever [sic] gave him the best offer." However, nobody bought the manuscript.

Hubbard's failure to sell Excalibur depressed him; he told his wife in an October 1938 letter: "Writing action pulp doesn't have much agreement with what I want to do because it retards my progress by demanding incessant attention and, further, actually weakens my name. So you see I've got to do something about it and at the same time strengthen the old financial position." He went on:

Forrest J Ackerman, later Hubbard's literary agent, recalled that Hubbard told him "whoever read it either went insane or committed suicide. And he said that the last time he had shown it to a publisher in New York, he walked into the office to find out what the reaction was, the publisher called for the reader, the reader came in with the manuscript, threw it on the table and threw himself out of the skyscraper window."
In 1948, Hubbard would tell a convention of science fiction fans that Excalibur inspiration came during an operation in which he "died" for eight minutes.

The manuscript later became part of Scientology mythology. An early 1950s Scientology publication offered signed "gold-bound and locked" copies for the sum of $1,500 apiece. It warned that "four of the first fifteen people who read it went insane" and that it would be "[r]eleased only on sworn statement not to permit other readers to read it. Contains data not to be released during Mr. Hubbard's stay on earth."

Alaska trip

Hubbard joined The Explorers Club in February 1940 on the strength of his claimed explorations in the Caribbean and survey flights in the United States. He persuaded the club to let him carry its flag on an "Alaskan Radio-Experimental Expedition". The crew consisted of Hubbard and his wife aboard his ketch Magician.

The trip was plagued by problems and did not get any further than Ketchikan. The ship's engine broke down only two days after setting off in July 1940. Having underestimated the cost of the trip, he did not have enough money to repair the broken engine. He raised money by writing stories and contributing to the local radio station and eventually earned enough to fix the engine, making it back to Puget Sound on December 27, 1940.

Military career

After returning from Alaska, Hubbard applied to join the United States Navy. His friend Robert MacDonald Ford sent a letter of recommendation describing Hubbard as "one of the most brilliant men I have ever known". Ford later said that Hubbard had written the letter himself: "I don't know why Ron wanted a letter. I just gave him a letter-head and said, 'Hell, you're the writer, you write it!'"

Hubbard was commissioned as a lieutenant junior grade in the United States Naval Reserve on July 19, 1941. By November, he was posted to New York for training as an intelligence officer.> On December 18, he was posted to the Philippines and set out for the posting via Australia. While in Melbourne awaiting transport to Manilla, Hubbard was sent back to the United States. The U.S. naval attaché reported, "This officer is not satisfactory for independent duty assignment. He is garrulous and tries to give impressions of his importance. He also seems to think he has unusual ability in most lines. These characteristics indicate that he will require close supervision for satisfactory performance of any intelligence duty."

On September 25, 1942, the commandant of Boston Navy Yard informed Washington that, in his view, Hubbard was "not temperamentally fitted for independent command." Days later, on October 1, Hubbard was summarily relieved of his command.
 
On May 18, PC-815 sailed on her shakedown cruise, bound for San Diego. Only five hours into the voyage, Hubbard believed he had detected an enemy submarine. Hubbard spent the next 68 hours engaged in combat, until finally receiving orders to return to Astoria. Admiral Frank Jack Fletcher, commander of the Northwest Sea Frontier, concluded: "An analysis of all reports convinces me that there was no submarine in the area." Fletcher suggested Hubbard had mistaken a "known magnetic deposit" for an enemy sub.

The following month, Hubbard unwittingly sailed PC-815 into Mexican territorial waters and conducted gunnery practice off the Coronado Islands, in the belief that they were uninhabited and belonged to the United States. The Mexican government complained and Hubbard was relieved of command. A report written after the incident rated Hubbard as unsuitable for independent duties and "lacking in the essential qualities of judgment, leadership and cooperation". The report recommended he be assigned "duty on a large vessel where he can be properly supervised".

Hospitalizations and "discovery" of sabotage attempt

After being relieved of command of PC-815, Hubbard began reporting sick, citing a variety of ailments, including ulcers, malaria, and back pains. Hubbard was admitted to the San Diego naval hospital for observation—he would remain there for nearly three months. Years later, Hubbard would privately write to himself: "Your stomach trouble you used as an excuse to keep the Navy from punishing you. You are free of the Navy."

In 1944, Hubbard was posted to Portland where  was under construction. The ship was commissioned in July and Hubbard served as the navigation and training officer. Hubbard requested, and was granted, a transfer to the School of Military Government in Princeton. The night before his departure, the ship's log reports that "The Navigating Officer [Hubbard] reported to the OOD [Officer On Duty] that an attempt at sabotage had been made sometime between 1530–1600. A coke bottle filled with gasoline with a cloth wick inserted had been concealed among cargo which was to be hoisted aboard and stored in No 1 hold. It was discovered before being taken on board. ONI, FBI and NSD authorities reported on the scene and investigations were started."

Hubbard attended school in Princeton until January 1945, when he was assigned to Monterey, California. In April, he again reported sick and was re-admitted to Oak Knoll Naval Hospital, Oakland. His complaints included "headaches, rheumatism, conjunctivitis, pains in his side, stomach aches, pains in his shoulder, arthritis, hemorrhoids". An October 1945 naval board found that Hubbard was "considered physically qualified to perform duty ashore, preferably within the continental United States". He was discharged from the hospital on December 4, 1945, and transferred to inactive duty on February 17, 1946. Hubbard would ultimately resign his commission after the publication of Dianetics, with effect from October 30, 1950.

Occult involvement in Pasadena

Hubbard's life underwent a turbulent period immediately after the war. According to his own account, he "was abandoned by family and friends as a supposedly hopeless cripple and a probable burden upon them for the rest of my days". His daughter Katherine presented a rather different version: his wife had refused to uproot their children from their home in Bremerton, Washington, to join him in California. Their marriage was by now in terminal difficulties and he chose to stay in California.

In August 1945, Hubbard moved into the Pasadena mansion of John "Jack" Whiteside Parsons. A leading rocket propulsion researcher at the California Institute of Technology and a founder of the Jet Propulsion Laboratory, Parsons led a double life as an avid occultist and Thelemite, follower of the English ceremonial magician Aleister Crowley and leader of a lodge of Crowley's magical order, Ordo Templi Orientis (OTO). He let rooms in the house only to tenants who he specified should be "atheists and those of a Bohemian disposition".

Hubbard befriended Parsons and soon became sexually involved with Parsons's 21-year-old girlfriend, Sara "Betty" Northrup. Despite this, Parsons was very impressed with Hubbard and reported to Crowley:

Hubbard, whom Parsons referred to in writing as "Frater H", became an enthusiastic collaborator in the Pasadena OTO. The two men collaborated on the "Babalon Working", a sex magic ritual intended to summon an incarnation of Babalon, the supreme Thelemite Goddess. It was undertaken over several nights in February and March 1946 in order to summon an "elemental" who would participate in further sex magic. As Richard Metzger describes it,

The "elemental" arrived a few days later in the form of Marjorie Cameron, who agreed to participate in Parsons's rites. Soon afterwards, Parsons, Hubbard and Sara agreed to set up a business partnership, "Allied Enterprises", in which they invested nearly their entire savings—the vast majority contributed by Parsons. The plan was for Hubbard and Sara to buy yachts in Miami and sail them to the West Coast to sell for a profit. Hubbard had a different idea; he wrote to the U.S. Navy requesting permission to leave the country "to visit Central & South America & China" for the purposes of "collecting writing material"—in other words, undertaking a world cruise. Aleister Crowley strongly criticized Parsons's actions, writing: "Suspect Ron playing confidence trick—Jack Parsons weak fool—obvious victim prowling swindlers." Parsons attempted to recover his money by obtaining an injunction to prevent Hubbard and Sara leaving the country or disposing of the remnants of his assets. They attempted to sail anyway but were forced back to port by a storm. A week later, Allied Enterprises was dissolved. Parsons received only a $2,900 promissory note from Hubbard and returned home "shattered". He had to sell his mansion to developers soon afterwards to recoup his losses.

Hubbard's fellow writers were well aware of what had happened between him and Parsons. L. Sprague de Camp wrote to Isaac Asimov on August 27, 1946, to tell him:

On August 10, 1946, Hubbard bigamously married Sara, while still married to Polly. It was not until 1947 that his first wife learned that he had remarried. Hubbard agreed to divorce Polly in June that year and the marriage was dissolved shortly afterwards, with Polly given custody of the children.

During this period, Hubbard authored a document which has been called the "Affirmations" (also referred to as the "Admissions"). They consist of a series of statements by and addressed to Hubbard, relating to various physical, sexual, psychological and social issues that he was encountering in his life. The Affirmations appear to have been intended to be used as a form of self-hypnosis with the intention of resolving the author's psychological problems and instilling a positive mental attitude. In her book, Janet Reitman called the Affirmations "the most revealing psychological self-assessment, complete with exhortations to himself, that [Hubbard] had ever made." Among the Affirmations:
 "Your eyes are getting progressively better. They became bad when you used them as an excuse to escape the naval academy. You have no reason to keep them bad."
 "Your stomach trouble you used as an excuse to keep the Navy from punishing you. You are free of the Navy."
 "Your hip is a pose. You have a sound hip. It never hurts. Your shoulder never hurts."
 "Your foot was an alibi. The injury is no longer needed."
 "You can tell all the romantic tales you wish. ... But you know which ones were lies ... You have enough real experience to make anecdotes forever. Stick to your true adventures."
 "Masturbation does not injure or make insane. Your parents were in error. Everyone masturbates."

Request for psychiatric treatment

After Hubbard's wedding to Sara, the couple settled at Laguna Beach, California, where Hubbard took a short-term job looking after a friend's yacht before resuming his fiction writing to supplement the small disability allowance that he was receiving as a war veteran. Working from a trailer in a run-down area of North Hollywood, Hubbard sold a number of science fiction stories that included his Ole Doc Methuselah series and the serialized novels The End Is Not Yet and To the Stars. However, he remained short of money and his son, L. Ron Hubbard Jr, testified later that Hubbard was dependent on his own father and Margaret's parents for money and his writings, which he was paid at a penny per word, never garnered him any more than $10,000 prior to the founding of Scientology. He repeatedly wrote to the Veterans Administration (VA) asking for an increase in his war pension.

In October 1947 he wrote to request psychiatric treatment:

The VA eventually did increase his pension, but his money problems continued. On August 31, 1948, he was arrested in San Luis Obispo, California, and subsequently pleaded guilty to a charge of petty theft, for which he was ordered to pay a $25 fine.

Dianetics

Origin
In 1948, Hubbard and his second wife Sara moved from California to Savannah, Georgia, where he would later claim to have worked as a volunteer lay practitioner in a local psychiatric clinic. In letters to friends, he began to make the first public mentions of what was to become Dianetics.

He wrote in January 1949 that he was working on a "book of psychology" about "the cause and cure of nervous tension", which he was going to call The Dark Sword, Excalibur or Science of the Mind. On March 8, 1949, Hubbard wrote to friend and fellow science-fiction author Robert Heinlein from Savannah, Georgia. Hubbard referenced Heinlein's earlier work Coventry, in which a utopian government has the ability to psychologically "cure" criminals of violent personality traits. He told Heinlein: 

His first published articles in Dianetics were "Terra Incognita: The Mind" in The Explorers Journal and another one that impacted people more heavily in Astounding Science Fiction.

In April 1949, Hubbard wrote to several professional organizations to offer his research. None were interested, so he turned to his editor John W. Campbell, who was more receptive due to a long-standing fascination with fringe psychologies and psychic powers ("psionics") that "permeated both his fiction and non-fiction".

Campbell invited Hubbard and Sara to move into a cottage at Bay Head, New Jersey, not far from his own home at Plainfield. In July 1949, Campbell recruited an acquaintance, Dr. Joseph Winter, to help develop Hubbard's new therapy of "Dianetics". Campbell told Winter:

Hubbard collaborated with Campbell and Winter to refine his techniques, testing them on science fiction fans recruited by Campbell. The basic principle of Dianetics was that the brain recorded every experience and event in a person's life, even when unconscious. Bad or painful experiences were stored as what he called "engrams" in a "reactive mind". These could be triggered later in life, causing emotional and physical problems. By carrying out a process he called "auditing", a person could be regressed through his engrams to re-experiencing past experiences. This enabled engrams to be "cleared". The subject, who would now be in a state of "Clear", would have a perfectly functioning mind with an improved IQ and photographic memory. The "Clear" would be cured of physical ailments ranging from poor eyesight to the common cold, which Hubbard asserted were purely psychosomatic.

Winter submitted a paper on Dianetics to the Journal of the American Medical Association and the American Journal of Psychiatry but both journals rejected it. Hubbard and his collaborators decided to announce Dianetics in Campbell's Astounding Science Fiction instead. In an editorial, Campbell said: "Its power is almost unbelievable; it proves the mind not only can but does rule the body completely; following the sharply defined basic laws set forth, physical ills such as ulcers, asthma and arthritis can be cured, as can all other psychosomatic ills." The birth of Hubbard's second daughter Alexis Valerie, delivered by Winter on March 8, 1950, came in the middle of the preparations to launch Dianetics. Shortly afterwards in April 1950, a "Hubbard Dianetic Research Foundation" was established in Elizabeth, New Jersey, with Hubbard, Sara, Winter and Campbell on the board of directors.

Hubbard described Dianetics as "the hidden source of all psychosomatic ills and human aberration" when he introduced Dianetics to the world in the 1950s. He further claimed that "skills have been developed for their invariable cure." Dianetics was duly launched in Astounding's May 1950 issue and on May 9, Hubbard's companion book Dianetics: The Modern Science of Mental Health was published by Hermitage House. Hubbard abandoned freelance writing in order to promote Dianetics, writing several books about it in the next decade and delivering an estimated 4,000 lectures while founding Dianetics research organizations.

Initial success

Dianetics was an immediate commercial success and sparked what Martin Gardner calls "a nationwide cult of incredible proportions". By August 1950, Hubbard's book had sold 55,000 copies, was selling at the rate of 4,000 a week and was being translated into French, German and Japanese. Five hundred Dianetic auditing groups had been set up across the United States.

Dianetics was poorly received by the press and the scientific and medical professions. The American Psychological Association criticized Hubbard's claims as "not supported by empirical evidence". Scientific American said that Hubbard's book contained "more promises and less evidence per page than any publication since the invention of printing", while The New Republic called it a "bold and immodest mixture of complete nonsense and perfectly reasonable common sense, taken from long acknowledged findings and disguised and distorted by a crazy, newly invented terminology". Some of Hubbard's fellow science fiction writers also criticized it; Isaac Asimov considered it "gibberish" while Jack Williamson called it "a lunatic revision of Freudian psychology".

Several famous individuals became involved with Dianetics. Aldous Huxley received auditing from Hubbard; the poet Jean Toomer and the science fiction writers Theodore Sturgeon and A. E. van Vogt became trained Dianetics auditors. Vogt temporarily abandoned writing and became the head of the newly established Los Angeles branch of the Hubbard Dianetic Research Foundation. Other branches were established in New York, Washington, D.C., Chicago, and Honolulu. Psychologist and systems theorist William T. Powers, also prolific as a science fiction writer, was another early advocate and researcher connected with the Chicago branch.

Although Dianetics was not cheap, a great many people were nonetheless willing to pay; van Vogt later recalled "doing little but tear open envelopes and pull out $500 checks from people who wanted to take an auditor's course". Financial controls were lax. Hubbard himself took large sums with no explanation of what he was doing with it. On one occasion, van Vogt saw Hubbard taking a lump sum of $56,000 out of the Los Angeles Foundation's proceeds. One of Hubbard's employees, Helen O'Brien, commented that at the Elizabeth, N.J. branch of the Foundation, the books showed that "a month's income of $90,000 is listed, with only $20,000 accounted for".

Hubbard played a very active role in the Dianetics boom, writing, lecturing and training auditors. Many of those who knew him spoke of being impressed by his personal charisma. Jack Horner, who became a Dianetics auditor in 1950, later said, "He was very impressive, dedicated and amusing. The man had tremendous charisma; you just wanted to hear every word he had to say and listen for any pearl of wisdom." Isaac Asimov recalled in his autobiography how, at a dinner party, he, Robert Heinlein, L. Sprague de Camp and their wives "all sat as quietly as pussycats and listened to Hubbard. He told tales with perfect aplomb and in complete paragraphs." As Atack comments, he was "a charismatic figure who compelled the devotion of those around him". Christopher Evans described the personal qualities that Hubbard brought to Dianetics and Scientology:

Collapse of Dianetics Foundation and subsequent kidnappings

Dianetics lost public credibility in August 1950 when a presentation by Hubbard before an audience of 6,000 at the Shrine Auditorium in Los Angeles failed disastrously. He introduced a Clear named Sonya Bianca and told the audience that as a result of undergoing Dianetic therapy she now possessed perfect recall. However, Gardner writes, "in the demonstration that followed, she failed to remember a single formula in physics (the subject in which she was majoring) or the color of Hubbard's tie when his back was turned. At this point, a large part of the audience got up and left."

Hubbard's supporters soon began to have doubts about Dianetics. Winter became disillusioned, and in 1951, he wrote that he had never seen a single convincing Clear: "I have seen some individuals who are supposed to have been 'clear,' but their behavior does not conform to the definition of the state. Moreover, an individual supposed to have been 'clear' has undergone a relapse into conduct which suggests an incipient psychosis." He also deplored the Foundation's omission of any serious scientific research.

Hubbard also faced other practitioners moving into leadership positions within the Dianetics community. It was structured as an open, public practice in which others were free to pursue their own lines of research and claim that their approaches to auditing produced better results than Hubbard's. The community rapidly splintered and its members mingled Hubbard's ideas with a wide variety of esoteric and occult practices.

By late 1950, the Elizabeth, N.J. Foundation was in financial crisis and the Los Angeles Foundation was more than $200,000 in debt. Winter and Art Ceppos, the publisher of Hubbard's book, resigned under acrimonious circumstances. Campbell also resigned, criticizing Hubbard for being impossible to work with, and blamed him for the disorganization and financial ruin of the Foundations. By the summer of 1951, the Elizabeth, N.J. Foundation and all of its branches had closed.

The collapse of Hubbard's marriage to Sara created yet more problems. He had begun an affair with his 20-year-old public relations assistant in late 1950, while Sara started a relationship with Dianetics auditor Miles Hollister. Hubbard secretly denounced the couple to the FBI in March 1951, portraying them in a letter as communist infiltrators. According to Hubbard, Sara was "currently intimate with [communists] but evidently under coercion. Drug addiction set in fall 1950. Nothing of this known to me until a few weeks ago." Hollister was described as having a "sharp chin, broad forehead, rather Slavic". He was said to be the "center of most turbulence in our organization" and "active and dangerous". The FBI did not take Hubbard seriously: an agent annotated his correspondence with the comment, "Appears mental."

Three weeks later, Hubbard and two Foundation staff seized Sara and his year-old daughter Alexis and forcibly took them to San Bernardino, California, where he attempted unsuccessfully to find a doctor to examine Sara and declare her insane. He let Sara go but took Alexis to Havana, Cuba. Sara filed a divorce suit on April 23, 1951, that accused him of marrying her bigamously and subjecting her to sleep deprivation, beatings, strangulation, kidnapping and exhortations to commit suicide. The case led to newspaper headlines such as "Ron Hubbard Insane, Says His Wife." Sara finally secured the return of her daughter in June 1951 by agreeing to a settlement with her husband in which she signed a statement, written by him, declaring:

Dianetics appeared to be on the edge of total collapse. However, it was saved by Don Purcell, a millionaire businessman and Dianeticist who agreed to support a new Foundation in Wichita, Kansas. Their collaboration ended after less than a year when they fell out over the future direction of Dianetics. The Wichita Foundation became financially nonviable after a court ruled that it was liable for the unpaid debts of its defunct predecessor in Elizabeth, N.J. The ruling prompted Purcell and the other directors of the Wichita Foundation to file for voluntary bankruptcy in February 1952. Hubbard resigned immediately and accused Purcell of having been bribed by the American Medical Association to destroy Dianetics. Hubbard established a "Hubbard College" on the other side of town where he continued to promote Dianetics while fighting Purcell in the courts over the Foundation's intellectual property.

Only six weeks after setting up the Hubbard College and marrying a staff member, 18-year-old Mary Sue Whipp, Hubbard closed it down and moved with his new bride to Phoenix, Arizona. He established a Hubbard Association of Scientologists International to promote his new "Science of Certainty"—Scientology. Scientology and Dianetics have been differentiated as follows: Dianetics is all about releasing the mind from the "distorting influence of engrams", and Scientology "is the study and handling of the spirit in relation to itself, universes and other life".

Rise of Scientology

The Church of Scientology attributes its genesis to Hubbard's discovery of "a new line of research"—"that man is most fundamentally a spiritual being (a thetan)". Non-Scientologist writers have suggested alternative motives: that he aimed "to reassert control over his creation", that he believed "he was about to lose control of Dianetics", or that he wanted to ensure "he would be able to stay in business even if the courts eventually awarded control of Dianetics and its valuable copyrights to ... the hated Don Purcell." Harlan Ellison has told a story of seeing Hubbard at a gathering of the Hydra Club in 1953 or 1954. Hubbard was complaining of not being able to make a living on what he was being paid as a science fiction writer. Ellison says that Lester del Rey told Hubbard that what he needed to do to get rich was start a religion.

Hubbard expanded upon the basics of Dianetics to construct a spiritually oriented (though at this stage not religious) doctrine based on the concept that the true self of a person was a thetan—an immortal, omniscient and potentially omnipotent entity. Hubbard taught that thetans, having created the material universe, had forgotten their god-like powers and become trapped in physical bodies. Scientology aimed to "rehabilitate" each person's self (the thetan) to restore its original capacities and become once again an "Operating Thetan". Hubbard insisted humanity was imperiled by the forces of "aberration", which were the result of engrams carried by immortal thetans for billions of years.

In 2012, Ohio State University professor Hugh Urban argued that Hubbard had adopted many of his theories from the early to mid 20th century astral projection pioneer Sylvan Muldoon stating that Hubbard's description of exteriorizing the thetan is extremely similar if not identical to the descriptions of astral projection in occult literature popularized by Muldoon's widely read Phenomena of Astral Projection (1951) (co-written with Hereward Carrington) and that Muldoon's description of the astral body as being connected to the physical body by a long thin, elastic cord is virtually identical to the one described in Hubbard's "Excalibur" vision.

Hubbard introduced a device called an E-meter that he presented as having, as Miller puts it, "an almost mystical power to reveal an individual's innermost thoughts". He promulgated Scientology through a series of lectures, bulletins and books such as A History of Man ("a cold-blooded and factual account of your last sixty trillion years") and Scientology: 8-8008 ("With this book, the ability to make one's body old or young at will, the ability to heal the ill without physical contact, the ability to cure the insane and the incapacitated, is set forth for the physician, the layman, the mathematician and the physicist.")

Scientology was organized in a very different way from the decentralized Dianetics movement. The Hubbard Association of Scientologists (HAS) was the only official Scientology organization. Training procedures and doctrines were standardized and promoted through HAS publications, and administrators and auditors were not permitted to deviate from Hubbard's approach. Branches or "orgs" were organized as franchises, rather like a fast food restaurant chain. Each franchise holder was required to pay ten percent of income to Hubbard's central organization. They were expected to find new recruits, known as "raw meat", but were restricted to providing only basic services. Costlier higher-level auditing was only provided by Hubbard's central organization.

Although this model would eventually be extremely successful, Scientology was a very small-scale movement at first. Hubbard started off with only a few dozen followers, generally dedicated Dianeticists; a seventy-hour series of lectures in Philadelphia in December 1952 was attended by just 38 people. Hubbard was joined in Phoenix by his 18-year-old son Nibs, who had been unable to settle down in high school. Nibs had decided to become a Scientologist, moved into his father's home and went on to become a Scientology staff member and "professor". Hubbard also traveled to the United Kingdom to establish his control over a Dianetics group in London. It was very much a shoestring operation; as Helen O'Brien later recalled, "there was an atmosphere of extreme poverty and undertones of a grim conspiracy over all. At 163 Holland Park Avenue was an ill-lit lecture room and a bare-boarded and poky office some eight by ten feet—mainly infested by long haired men and short haired and tatty women." On September 24, 1952, only a few weeks after arriving in London, Hubbard's wife Mary Sue gave birth to her first child, a daughter whom they named Diana Meredith de Wolfe Hubbard.

In February 1953, Hubbard acquired a doctorate from Sequoia University, an unaccredited degree mill.

As membership declined and finances grew tighter, Hubbard had reversed the hostility to religion he voiced in Dianetics. A few weeks after becoming "Dr." Hubbard, he authored a letter outlining plans for transforming Scientology into a religion. In that letter, Hubbard proposed setting up a chain of "Spiritual Guidance Centers" charging customers $500 for twenty-four hours of auditing proposing that Scientology should be transformed into a religion:>

The letter's recipient, Helen O'Brien, resigned the following September. She criticized Hubbard for creating "a temperate zone voodoo, in its inelasticity, unexplainable procedures, and mindless group euphoria".

The idea may not have been new; Hubbard has been quoted as telling a science fiction convention in 1948: "Writing for a penny a word is ridiculous. If a man really wants to make a million dollars, the best way would be to start his own religion." J. Gordon Melton notes, "There is no record of Hubbard having ever made this statement, though several of his science fiction colleagues have noted the broaching of the subject on one of their informal conversations."

Despite objections, on December 18, 1953, Hubbard incorporated the Church of Scientology, Church of American Science and Church of Spiritual Engineering in Camden, New Jersey. Hubbard, his wife Mary Sue and his secretary John Galusha became the trustees of all three corporations. The reason for Scientology's religious transformation was explained by officials of the HAS:

Scientology franchises became Churches of Scientology and some auditors began dressing as clergymen, complete with clerical collars. If they were arrested in the course of their activities, Hubbard advised, they should sue for massive damages for molesting "a Man of God going about his business". A few years later he told Scientologists: "If attacked on some vulnerable point by anyone or anything or any organization, always find or manufacture enough threat against them to cause them to sue for peace ... Don't ever defend, always attack." Any individual breaking away from Scientology and setting up his own group was to be shut down:

The 1950s saw Scientology growing steadily. Hubbard finally achieved victory over Don Purcell in 1954 when the latter, worn out by constant litigation, handed the copyrights of Dianetics back to Hubbard. Most of the formerly independent Scientology and Dianetics groups were either driven out of business or were absorbed into Hubbard's organizations. Hubbard marketed Scientology through medical claims, such as attracting polio sufferers by presenting the Church of Scientology as a scientific research foundation investigating polio cases. One advertisement during this period stated:

Scientology became a highly profitable enterprise for Hubbard. He implemented a scheme under which he was paid a percentage of the Church of Scientology's gross income and by 1957 he was being paid about $250,000. His family grew, too, with Mary Sue giving birth to three more children—Geoffrey Quentin McCaully on January 6, 1954; Mary Suzette Rochelle on February 13, 1955; and Arthur Ronald Conway on June 6, 1958. In the spring of 1959, he used his new-found wealth to purchase Saint Hill Manor, an 18th-century country house in Sussex, formerly owned by Sawai Man Singh II, the Maharaja of Jaipur. The house became Hubbard's permanent residence and an international training center for Scientologists.

Controversies and crises

 

By the start of the 1960s, Hubbard was the leader of a worldwide movement with thousands of followers. A decade later, however, he had left Saint Hill Manor and moved aboard his own private fleet of ships as the Church of Scientology faced worldwide controversy.

The Church of Scientology says that the problems of this period were due to "vicious, covert international attacks" by the United States government, "all of which were proven false and baseless, which were to last 27 years and finally culminated in the Government being sued for 750 million dollars for conspiracy." Behind the attacks, stated Hubbard, lay a vast conspiracy of "psychiatric front groups" secretly controlling governments: "Every single lie, false charge and attack on Scientology has been traced directly to this group's members. They have sought at great expense for nineteen years to crush and eradicate any new development in the field of the mind. They are actively preventing any effectiveness in this field."

Hubbard believed that Scientology was being infiltrated by saboteurs and spies and introduced "security checking" to identify those he termed "potential trouble sources" and "suppressive persons". Members of the Church of Scientology were interrogated with the aid of E-meters and were asked questions such as "Have you ever practiced homosexuality?" and "Have you ever had unkind thoughts about L. Ron Hubbard?" For a time, Scientologists were even interrogated about crimes committed in past lives: "Have you ever destroyed a culture?" "Did you come to Earth for evil purposes?" "Have you ever zapped anyone?"

He also sought to exert political influence, advising Scientologists to vote against Richard Nixon in the 1960 presidential election and establishing a Department of Government Affairs "to bring government and hostile philosophies or societies into a state of complete compliance with the goals of Scientology". This, he said, "is done by high-level ability to control and in its absence by a low-level ability to overwhelm. Introvert such agencies. Control such agencies."

The U.S. Government was already well aware of Hubbard's activities. The FBI had a lengthy file on him, including a 1951 interview with an agent who considered him a "mental case". Police forces in a number of jurisdictions began exchanging information about Scientology through the auspices of Interpol, which eventually led to prosecutions. In 1958, the U.S. Internal Revenue Service withdrew the Washington, D.C. Church of Scientology's tax exemption after it found that Hubbard and his family were profiting unreasonably from Scientology's ostensibly non-profit income. The Food and Drug Administration took action against Scientology's medical claims, seizing thousands of pills being marketed as "radiation cures" as well as publications and E-meters. The Church of Scientology was required to label them as being "ineffective in the diagnosis or treatment of disease".

Following the FDA's actions, Scientology attracted increasingly unfavorable publicity across the English-speaking world. It faced particularly hostile scrutiny in Victoria, Australia, where it was accused of brainwashing, blackmail, extortion and damaging the mental health of its members. The Victorian state government established a Board of Inquiry into Scientology in November 1963. Its report, published in October 1965, condemned every aspect of Scientology and Hubbard himself. He was described as being of doubtful sanity, having a persecution complex and displaying strong indications of paranoid schizophrenia with delusions of grandeur. His writings were characterized as nonsensical, abounding in "self-glorification and grandiosity, replete with histrionics and hysterical, incontinent outbursts". Sociologist Roy Wallis comments that the report drastically changed public perceptions of Scientology:

The report led to Scientology being banned in Victoria, Western Australia and South Australia, and led to more negative publicity around the world. Newspapers and politicians in the UK pressed the British government for action against Scientology. In April 1966, hoping to form a remote "safe haven" for Scientology, Hubbard traveled to the southern African country Rhodesia (today Zimbabwe) and looked into setting up a base there at a hotel on Lake Kariba. Despite his attempts to curry favour with the local government—he personally delivered champagne to Prime Minister Ian Smith's house, but Smith refused to see him—Rhodesia promptly refused to renew Hubbard's visa, compelling him to leave the country. In July 1968, the British Minister of Health, Kenneth Robinson, announced that foreign Scientologists would no longer be permitted to enter the UK and Hubbard himself was excluded from the country as an "undesirable alien". Further inquiries were launched in Canada, New Zealand and South Africa.

Hubbard took three major new initiatives in the face of these challenges. "Ethics Technology" was introduced to tighten internal discipline within Scientology. It required Scientologists to "disconnect" from any organization or individual—including family members—deemed to be disruptive or "suppressive". According to church-operated websites, "A person who disconnects is simply exercising his right to communicate or not to communicate with a particular person." Hubbard stated: "Communication, however, is a two-way flow. If one has the right to communicate, then one must also have the right to not receive communication from another. It is this latter corollary of the right to communicate that gives us our right to privacy." Scientologists were also required to write "Knowledge Reports" on each other, reporting transgressions or misapplications of Scientology methods. Hubbard promulgated a long list of punishable "Misdemeanors", "Crimes", and "High Crimes". The "Fair Game" policy was introduced, which was applicable to anyone deemed an "enemy" of Scientology: "May be deprived of property or injured by any means by any Scientologist without any discipline of the Scientologist. May be tricked, sued or lied to or destroyed."

At the start of March 1966, Hubbard created the Guardian's Office (GO), a new agency within the Church of Scientology that was headed by his wife Mary Sue. It dealt with Scientology's external affairs, including public relations, legal actions and the gathering of intelligence on perceived threats. As Scientology faced increasingly negative media attention, the GO retaliated with hundreds of writs for libel and slander; it issued more than forty on a single day. Hubbard ordered his staff to find "lurid, blood sex crime actual evidence  on [Scientology's] attackers".

Finally, at the end of 1966, Hubbard acquired his own fleet of ships. He established the "Hubbard Explorational Company Ltd" which purchased three ships—the Enchanter, a forty-ton schooner, the Avon River, an old trawler, and the Royal Scotman , a former Irish Sea cattle ferry that he made his home and flagship. The ships were crewed by the Sea Organization or Sea Org, a group of Scientologist volunteers, with the support of a couple of professional seamen.

Commodore of the Sea Org

After Hubbard created the Sea Org "fleet" in early 1967 in the Canary Islands it began an eight-year voyage, sailing from port to port in the Mediterranean Sea and eastern North Atlantic. The fleet traveled as far as Corfu in the eastern Mediterranean and Dakar and the Azores in the Atlantic, but rarely stayed anywhere for longer than six weeks. Ken Urquhart, Hubbard's personal assistant at the time, later recalled:

When Hubbard established the Sea Org he publicly declared that he had relinquished his management responsibilities. According to Miller, this was not true. He received daily telex messages from Scientology organizations around the world reporting their statistics and income. The Church of Scientology sent him $15,000 a week and millions of dollars were transferred to his bank accounts in Switzerland and Liechtenstein. Couriers arrived regularly, conveying luxury food for Hubbard and his family or cash that had been smuggled from England to avoid currency export restrictions.

Along the way, Hubbard sought to establish a safe haven in "a friendly little country where Scientology would be allowed to prosper", as Miller puts it. The fleet stayed at Corfu for several months in 1968–1969. Hubbard renamed the ships after Greek gods—the Royal Scotman was rechristened Apollo—and he praised the recently established military dictatorship. The Sea Org was represented as "Professor Hubbard's Philosophy School" in a telegram to the Greek government. In March 1969, however, Hubbard and his ships were ordered to leave. In mid-1972, Hubbard tried again in Morocco, establishing contacts with the country's secret police and training senior policemen and intelligence agents in techniques for detecting subversives. The program ended in failure when it became caught up in internal Moroccan politics, and Hubbard left the country hastily in December 1972.

At the same time, Hubbard was still developing Scientology's doctrines. A Scientology biography states that "free of organizational duties and aided by the first Sea Org members, L. Ron Hubbard now had the time and facilities to confirm in the physical universe some of the events and places he had encountered in his journeys down the track of time." In 1965, he designated several existing Scientology courses as confidential, repackaging them as the first of the esoteric "OT levels". Two years later he announced the release of OT3, the "Wall of Fire", revealing the secrets of an immense disaster that had occurred "on this planet, and on the other seventy-five planets which form this Confederacy, seventy-five million years ago". Scientologists were required to undertake the first two OT levels before learning how Xenu, the leader of the Galactic Confederacy, had shipped billions of people to Earth and blown them up with hydrogen bombs, following which their traumatized spirits were stuck together at "implant stations", brainwashed with false memories and eventually became contained within human beings. The discovery of OT3 was said to have taken a major physical toll on Hubbard, who announced that he had broken a knee, an arm, and his back during the course of his research. A year later, in 1968, he unveiled OT levels 4 to 6 and began delivering OT training courses to Scientologists aboard the Royal Scotman.

Scientologists around the world were presented with a glamorous picture of life in the Sea Org and many applied to join Hubbard aboard the fleet. What they found was rather different from the image. Most of those joining had no nautical experience at all. Mechanical difficulties and blunders by the crews led to a series of embarrassing incidents and near-disasters. Following one incident in which the rudder of the Royal Scotman was damaged during a storm, Hubbard ordered the ship's entire crew to be reduced to a "condition of liability" and wear gray rags tied to their arms. The ship itself was treated the same way, with dirty tarpaulins tied around its funnel to symbolize its lower status. According to those aboard, conditions were appalling; the crew was worked to the point of exhaustion, given meager rations and forbidden to wash or change their clothes for several weeks. Hubbard maintained a harsh disciplinary regime aboard the fleet, punishing mistakes by confining people in the Royal Scotman bilge tanks without toilet facilities and with food provided in buckets. At other times erring crew members were thrown overboard with Hubbard looking on and, occasionally, filming. David Mayo, a Sea Org member at the time, later recalled:

From about 1970, Hubbard was attended aboard ship by the children of Sea Org members, organized as the Commodore's Messenger Organization (CMO). They were mainly young girls dressed in hot pants and halter tops, who were responsible for running errands for Hubbard such as lighting his cigarettes, dressing him or relaying his verbal commands to other members of the crew. In addition to his wife Mary Sue, he was accompanied by all four of his children by her, though not his first son Nibs, who had defected from Scientology in late 1959. The younger Hubbards were all members of the Sea Org and shared its rigors, though Quentin Hubbard reportedly found it difficult to adjust and attempted suicide in mid-1974.

Life in hiding

During the 1970s, Hubbard faced an increasing number of legal threats. French prosecutors charged him and the French Church of Scientology with fraud and customs violations in 1972. He was advised that he was at risk of being extradited to France. Hubbard left the Sea Org fleet temporarily at the end of 1972, living incognito in Queens, New York, until he returned to his flagship in September 1973 when the threat of extradition had abated. Scientology sources say that he carried out "a sociological study in and around New York City".

Hubbard's health deteriorated significantly during this period. A chain-smoker, he also suffered from bursitis and excessive weight, and had a prominent growth on his forehead. He suffered serious injuries in a motorcycle accident in 1973 and had a heart attack in 1975 that required him to take anticoagulant drugs for the next year. In September 1978, Hubbard had a pulmonary embolism, falling into a coma, but recovered.

He remained active in managing and developing Scientology, establishing the controversial Rehabilitation Project Force in 1974 and issuing policy and doctrinal bulletins. However, the Sea Org's voyages were coming to an end. The Apollo was banned from several Spanish ports and was expelled from Curaçao in October 1975. The Sea Org came to be suspected of being a CIA operation, leading to a riot in Funchal, Madeira, when the Apollo docked there. At the time, The Apollo Stars, a musical group founded by Hubbard and made up entirely of ship-bound members of the Sea Org, was offering free on-pier concerts in an attempt to promote Scientology, and the riot occurred at one of these events. Hubbard decided to relocate back to the United States to establish a "land base" for the Sea Org in Florida. The Church of Scientology attributes this decision to the activities on the Apollo having "outgrow[n] the ship's capacity".

In October 1975, Hubbard moved into a hotel suite in Daytona Beach. The Fort Harrison Hotel in Clearwater, Florida, was secretly acquired as the location for the "land base". On December 5, 1975, Hubbard and his wife Mary Sue moved into a condominium complex in nearby Dunedin. Their presence was meant to be a closely guarded secret but was accidentally compromised the following month. Hubbard immediately left Dunedin and moved to Georgetown, Washington, D.C., accompanied by a handful of aides and messengers, but not his wife. Six months later, following another security alert in July 1976, Hubbard moved to another safe house in Culver City, California. He lived there for only about three months, relocating in October to the more private confines of the Olive Tree Ranch near La Quinta. His second son Quentin committed suicide a few weeks later in Las Vegas.

Throughout this period, Hubbard was heavily involved in directing the activities of the Guardian's Office (GO), the legal bureau/intelligence agency that he had established in 1966. He believed that Scientology was being attacked by an international Nazi conspiracy, which he termed the "Tenyaka Memorial", through a network of drug companies, banks and psychiatrists in a bid to take over the world. In 1973, he instigated the "Snow White Program" and directed the GO to remove negative reports about Scientology from government files and track down their sources. The GO was ordered to "get all false and secret files on Scientology, LRH  ... that cannot be obtained legally, by all possible lines of approach ... i.e., job penetration, janitor penetration, suitable guises utilizing covers." His involvement in the GO's operations was concealed through the use of codenames. The GO carried out covert campaigns on his behalf such as Operation Bulldozer Leak, intended "to effectively spread the rumor that will lead Government, media, and individual [Suppressive Persons] to conclude that LRH has no control of the C of S and no legal liability for Church activity". He was kept informed of GO operations, such as the theft of medical records from a hospital, harassment of psychiatrists and infiltrations of organizations that had been critical of Scientology at various times, such as the Better Business Bureau, the American Medical Association, and American Psychiatric Association.

Members of the GO infiltrated and burglarized numerous government organizations, including the U.S. Department of Justice and the Internal Revenue Service. After two GO agents were caught in the Washington, D.C. headquarters of the IRS, the FBI carried out simultaneous raids on GO offices in Los Angeles and Washington, D.C. on July 7, 1977. They retrieved wiretap equipment, burglary tools and some 90,000 pages of incriminating documents. Hubbard was not prosecuted, though he was labeled an "unindicted co-conspirator" by government prosecutors. His wife Mary Sue was indicted and subsequently convicted of conspiracy. She was sent to a federal prison along with ten other Scientologists.

Hubbard's troubles increased in February 1978 when a French court convicted him in absentia for obtaining money under false pretenses. He was sentenced to four years in prison and a 35,000FF ($7,000) fine, . He went into hiding in April 1979, moving to an apartment in Hemet, California, where his only contact with the outside world was via ten trusted messengers. He cut contact with everyone else, even his wife, whom he saw for the last time in August 1979. Hubbard faced a possible indictment for his role in Operation Freakout, the GO's campaign against New York journalist Paulette Cooper, and in February 1980 he disappeared into deep cover in the company of two trusted messengers, Pat and Annie Broeker.

For the first few years of the 1980s, Hubbard and the Broekers lived on the move, touring the Pacific Northwest in a recreational vehicle and living for a while in apartments in Newport Beach and Los Angeles. Hubbard used his time in hiding to write his first new works of science fiction for nearly thirty years—Battlefield Earth (1982) and Mission Earth, a ten-volume series published between 1985 and 1987. They received mixed responses; as writer Jeff Walker puts it, they were "treated derisively by most critics but greatly admired by followers". Hubbard also wrote and composed music for three of his albums, which were produced by the Church of Scientology. The book soundtrack Space Jazz was released in 1982. Mission Earth and The Road to Freedom were released posthumously in 1986.

In Hubbard's absence, members of the Sea Org staged a takeover of the Church of Scientology and purged many veteran Scientologists. A young messenger, David Miscavige, became Scientology's de facto leader. Mary Sue Hubbard was forced to resign her position and her daughter Suzette became Miscavige's personal maid.

Death and legacy

For the last two years of his life, Hubbard lived in a luxury Blue Bird motorhome on Whispering Winds, a  ranch near Creston, California. He remained in deep hiding while controversy raged in the outside world about whether he was still alive and, if so, where. He spent his time "writing and researching", according to a spokesperson, and pursued photography and music, overseeing construction work and checking on his animals. He repeatedly redesigned the property, spending millions of dollars remodeling the ranch house—which went virtually uninhabited—and building a quarter-mile horse-racing track with an observation tower, which reportedly was never used.

He was still closely involved in managing the Church of Scientology via secretly delivered orders and continued to receive large amounts of money, of which Forbes magazine estimated "at least $200 million [was] gathered in Hubbard's name through 1982." In September 1985, the IRS notified the Church that it was considering indicting Hubbard for tax fraud.

Hubbard suffered further ill-health, including chronic pancreatitis, during his residence at Whispering Winds. He suffered a stroke on January 17, 1986, and died a week later. His body was cremated and the ashes were scattered at sea. Scientology leaders announced that his body had become an impediment to his work and that he had decided to "drop his body" to continue his research on another planet, having "learned how to do it without a body".

Hubbard was survived by his wife Mary Sue and all of his children except his second son Quentin. His will provided a trust fund to support Mary Sue; her children Arthur, Diana and Suzette; and Katherine, the daughter of his first wife Polly. He disinherited two of his other children. L. Ron Hubbard, Jr. had become estranged, changed his name to "Ronald DeWolf" and, in 1982, sued unsuccessfully for control of his father's estate. Alexis Valerie, Hubbard's daughter by his second wife Sara, had attempted to contact her father in 1971. She was rebuffed with the implied claim that her real father was Jack Parsons rather than Hubbard, and that her mother had been a Nazi spy during the war. Both later accepted settlements when litigation was threatened. In 2001, Diana and Suzette were reported to still be Church members, while Arthur had left and become an artist. Hubbard's great-grandson, Jamie DeWolf, is a noted slam poet.

The copyrights of his works and much of his estate and wealth were willed to the Church of Scientology. In a bulletin dated May 5, 1980, Hubbard told his followers to preserve his teachings until an eventual reincarnation when he would return "not as a religious leader but as a political one". The Church of Spiritual Technology (CST), a sister organization of the Church of Scientology, has engraved Hubbard's entire corpus of Scientology and Dianetics texts on steel tablets stored in titanium containers. They are buried at the Trementina Base in a vault under a mountain near Trementina, New Mexico, on top of which the CST's logo has been bulldozed on such a gigantic scale that it is visible from space.

In the 1980s Hubbard's followers were buying large numbers of the books and re-issuing them to stores, in order to boost sales figures. Opinions are divided about his literary legacy. Scientologists have written of their desire to "make Ron the most acclaimed and widely known author of all time". The sociologist William Sims Bainbridge writes that even at his peak in the late 1930s Hubbard was regarded by readers of Astounding Science Fiction as merely "a passable, familiar author but not one of the best", while by the late 1970s "the [science fiction] subculture wishes it could forget him" and fans gave him a worse rating than any other of the "Golden Age" writers.

In 1996, the Los Angeles City Council renamed a street close to the Scientology headquarters "L. Ron Hubbard Way". In 2011, the West Valley City Council declared March 13 as L. Ron Hubbard Centennial Day. In April 2016, the New Jersey State Board of Education approved Hubbard's birthday as one of its religious holidays.
 
In 2004, eighteen years after Hubbard's death, the Church claimed eight million followers worldwide. According to religious scholar J. Gordon Melton, this is an overestimate, counting as Scientologists people who had merely bought a book. The City University of New York's American Religious Identification Survey found that by 2009 only 25,000 Americans identified as Scientologists. Hubbard's presence still pervades Scientology. Every Church of Scientology maintains an office reserved for Hubbard, with a desk, chair and writing equipment, ready to be used. Lonnie D. Kliever notes that Hubbard was "the only source of the religion, and he has no successor". Hubbard is referred to simply as "Source" within Scientology and the theological acceptability of any Scientology-related activity is determined by how closely it adheres to Hubbard's doctrines. Hubbard's name and signature are official trademarks of the Religious Technology Center, established in 1982 to control and oversee the use of Hubbard's works and Scientology's trademarks and copyrights. The RTC is the central organization within Scientology's complex corporate hierarchy and has put much effort into re-checking the accuracy of all Scientology publications to "ensur[e] the availability of the pure unadulterated writings of Mr. Hubbard to the coming generations".

The Danish historian of religions Mikael Rothstein describes Scientology as "a movement focused on the figure of Hubbard". He comments: "The fact that [Hubbard's] life is mythologized is as obvious as in the cases of Jesus, Muhammad or Siddartha Gotama. This is how religion works. Scientology, however, rejects this analysis altogether, and goes to great lengths to defend every detail of Hubbard's amazing and fantastic life as plain historical fact." Hubbard is presented as "the master of a multitude of disciplines" who performed extraordinary feats as a photographer, composer, scientist, therapist, explorer, navigator, philosopher, poet, artist, humanitarian, adventurer, soldier, scout, musician and many other fields of endeavor. The Church of Scientology portrays Hubbard's life and work as having proceeded seamlessly, "as if they were a continuous set of predetermined events and discoveries that unfolded through his lifelong research" even up to and beyond his death.

According to Rothstein's assessment of Hubbard's legacy, Scientology consciously aims to transfer the charismatic authority of Hubbard to institutionalize his authority over the organization, even after his death. Hubbard is presented as a virtually superhuman religious ideal just as Scientology itself is presented as the most important development in human history. As Rothstein puts it, "reverence for Scientology's scripture is reverence for Hubbard, the man who in the Scientological perspective single-handedly brought salvation to all human beings." David G. Bromley of the University of Virginia comments that the real Hubbard has been transformed into a "prophetic persona", "LRH", which acts as the basis for his prophetic authority within Scientology and transcends his biographical history. According to Dorthe Refslund Christensen, Hubbard's hagiography directly compares him with Buddha. Hubbard is viewed as having made Eastern traditions more accessible by approaching them with a scientific attitude. "Hubbard is seen as the ultimate-cross-cultural savior; he is thought to be able to release man from his miserable condition because he had the necessary background, and especially the right attitude."

Hubbard, although increasingly deified after his death, is the model Operating Thetan to Scientologists and their founder, and not God. Hubbard then is the "Source", "inviting others to follow his path in ways comparable to a Bodhisattva figure" according to religious scholar Donald A. Westbrook. Scientologists refer to L. Ron Hubbard as "Ron", referring to him as a personal friend.

Biographies

In the late 1970s, two men began to assemble a picture of Hubbard's life. Michael Linn Shannon, a resident of Portland, Oregon, became interested in Hubbard's life story after an encounter with a Scientology recruiter. Over the next four years he collected previously undisclosed records and documents. He intended to write an exposé of Hubbard and sent a copy of his findings and key records to a number of contacts but was unable to find a publisher.

Shannon's findings were acquired by Gerry Armstrong, a Scientologist who had been appointed Hubbard's official archivist. He had been given the job of assembling documents relating to Hubbard's life for the purpose of helping Omar V. Garrison, a non-Scientologist who had written two books sympathetic to Scientology, to write an official biography. However, the documents that he uncovered convinced both Armstrong and Garrison that Hubbard had systematically misrepresented his life. Garrison refused to write a "puff piece" and declared that he would not "repeat all the falsehoods they [the Church of Scientology] had perpetuated over the years". He wrote a "warts and all" biography while Armstrong quit Scientology, taking five boxes of papers with him. The Church of Scientology and Mary Sue Hubbard sued for the return of the documents while settling out of court with Garrison, requiring him to turn over the nearly completed manuscript of the biography. In October 1984 Judge Paul G. Breckenridge ruled in Armstrong's favor, saying:

In November 1987, the British journalist and writer Russell Miller published Bare-faced Messiah, the first full-length biography of L. Ron Hubbard. He drew on Armstrong's papers, official records and interviews with those who had known Hubbard including ex-Scientologists and family members. The book was well-received by reviewers but the Church of Scientology sought unsuccessfully to prohibit its publication on the grounds of copyright infringement. Other critical biographical accounts are found in Bent Corydon's L. Ron Hubbard, Messiah or Madman? (1987) and Jon Atack's A Piece of Blue Sky (1990).

Scientology biographies
Hagiographical accounts published by the Church of Scientology describe Hubbard as "a child prodigy of sorts" who rode a horse before he could walk and was able to read and write by the age of four. A Scientology profile says that he was brought up on his grandfather's "large cattle ranch in Montana" where he spent his days "riding, breaking broncos, hunting coyote and taking his first steps as an explorer". His grandfather is described as a "wealthy Western cattleman" from whom Hubbard "inherited his fortune and family interests in America, Southern Africa, etc." Scientology claims that Hubbard became a "blood brother" of the Native American Blackfeet tribe at the age of six through his friendship with a Blackfeet medicine man. 

However, contemporary records show that his grandfather, Lafayette Waterbury, was a veterinarian, not a rancher, and was not wealthy. Hubbard was actually raised in a townhouse in the center of Helena. According to his aunt, his family did not own a ranch but did own one cow and four or five horses on a few acres of land outside the city. Hubbard lived over a hundred miles from the Blackfeet reservation. While some sources support Scientology's claim of Hubbard's blood brotherhood, other sources say that the tribe did not practice blood brotherhood and no evidence has been found that he had ever been a Blackfeet blood brother.

According to Scientology biographies, during a journey to Washington, D.C. in 1923 Hubbard learned of Freudian psychology from Commander Joseph "Snake" Thompson, a U.S. Navy psychoanalyst and medic. Scientology biographies describe this encounter as giving Hubbard training in a particular scientific approach to the mind, which he found unsatisfying. In his diary, Hubbard claimed he was the youngest Eagle Scout in the U.S.

Scientology texts present Hubbard's travels in Asia as a time when he was intensely curious for answers to human suffering and explored ancient Eastern philosophies for answers, but found them lacking. He is described as traveling to China "at a time when few Westerners could enter" and according to Scientology, spent his time questioning Buddhist lamas and meeting old Chinese magicians. According to church materials, his travels were funded by his "wealthy grandfather".

Scientology accounts say that Hubbard "made his way deep into Manchuria's Western Hills and beyond — to break bread with Mongolian bandits, share campfires with Siberian shamans and befriend the last in the line of magicians from the court of Kublai Khan". However, Hubbard did not record these events in his diary. He remained unimpressed with China and the Chinese, writing: "A Chinaman can not live up to a thing, he always drags it down." He characterized the sights of Beijing as "rubberneck stations" for tourists and described the palaces of the Forbidden City as "very trashy-looking" and "not worth mentioning". He was impressed by the Great Wall of China near Beijing, but concluded of the Chinese: "They smell of all the baths they didn't take. The trouble with China is, there are too many chinks here."

Despite not graduating from George Washington, Hubbard claimed "to be not only a graduate engineer, but 'a member of the first United States course in formal education in what is called today nuclear physics.'" However, a Church of Scientology biography describes him as "never noted for being in class" and says that he "thoroughly detest[ed] his subjects". He earned poor grades, was placed on probation in September 1931 and dropped out altogether in the fall of 1932. Hubbard is noted as once being offered employment at the Soviet-American trade organization AMTORG

Scientology accounts say that he "studied nuclear physics at George Washington University in Washington, D.C., before he started his studies about the mind, spirit and life" and Hubbard himself stated that he "set out to find out from nuclear physics a knowledge of the physical universe, something entirely lacking in Asian philosophy". His university records indicate that his exposure to "nuclear physics" consisted of one class in "atomic and molecular phenomena" for which he earned an "F" grade.

Scientologists claim he was more interested in extracurricular activities, particularly writing and flying. According to church materials, "he earned his wings as a pioneering barnstormer at the dawn of American aviation" and was "recognized as one of the country's most outstanding pilots. With virtually no training time, he takes up powered flight and barnstorms throughout the Midwest." His airman certificate, however, records that he qualified to fly only gliders rather than powered aircraft and gave up his certificate when he could not afford the renewal fee.

After leaving university Hubbard traveled to Puerto Rico on what the Church of Scientology calls the "Puerto Rican Mineralogical Expedition". Scientologists claim he "made the first complete mineralogical survey of Puerto Rico" as a means of "augmenting his [father's] pay with a mining venture", during which he "sluiced inland rivers and crisscrossed the island in search of elusive gold" as well as carrying out "much ethnological work amongst the interior villages and native hillsmen". Hubbard's unofficial biographer Russell Miller writes that neither the United States Geological Survey nor the Puerto Rican Department of Natural Resources have any record of any such expedition.

According to the Church of Scientology, Hubbard was "called to Hollywood" to work on film scripts in the mid-1930s, although Scientology accounts differ as to exactly when this was (whether 1935, 1936 or 1937). The Church of Scientology claims he also worked on the Columbia serials The Mysterious Pilot (1937), The Great Adventures of Wild Bill Hickok (1938) and The Spider Returns (1941), though his name does not appear on the credits. Hubbard also claimed to have written Dive Bomber (1941), Cecil B. DeMille's The Plainsman (1936) and John Ford's Stagecoach (1939).<

Scientology accounts of the expedition to Alaska describe "Hubbard's re-charting of an especially treacherous Inside Passage, and his ethnological study of indigenous Aleuts and Haidas" and tell of how "along the way, he not only roped a Kodiak Bear, but braved seventy-mile-an-hour winds and commensurate seas off the Aleutian Islands."

The Church disputes the official record of Hubbard's naval career. It asserts that the records are incomplete and perhaps falsified "to conceal Hubbard's secret activities as an intelligence officer". In 1990 the Church provided the Los Angeles Times with a document that was said to be a copy of Hubbard's official record of service. The U.S. Navy told the Times that "its contents are not supported by Hubbard's personnel record." The New Yorker reported in February 2011 that the Scientology document was considered by federal archivists to be a forgery.

The Church of Scientology presents him as a "much-decorated war hero who commanded a corvette and during hostilities was crippled and wounded". Scientology publications say he served as a "Commodore of Corvette squadrons" in "all five theaters of World War II" and was awarded "twenty-one medals and palms" for his service. He was "severely wounded and was taken crippled and blinded" to a military hospital, where he "worked his way back to fitness, strength and full perception in less than two years, using only what he knew and could determine about Man and his relationship to the universe". A. E. van Vogt recounted that Hubbard had seen combat repeatedly, and that he had once sailed his ship "right into the harbor of a Japanese occupied island in the Dutch East Indies. His attitude was that if you took your flag down the Japanese would not know one boat from another, so he tied up at the dock, went ashore and wandered around by himself for three days."

Hubbard's war service has great significance in the history and mythology of the Church of Scientology, as he is said to have cured himself through techniques that would later underpin Scientology and Dianetics. According to Moulton, Hubbard told him that he had been machine-gunned in the back near the Dutch East Indies. Hubbard asserted that his eyes had been damaged as well, either "by the flash of a large-caliber gun" or when he had "a bomb go off in my face". Scientology texts say that he returned from the war "[b]linded with injured optic nerves, and lame with physical injuries to hip and back" and was twice pronounced dead. Hubbard's official Navy service records indicate that "his military performance was, at times, substandard" and he received only four campaign medals rather than the claimed twenty-one. He was never recorded as being injured or wounded in combat and never received a Purple Heart.

The Church of Scientology says that Hubbard's key breakthrough in the development of Dianetics was made at Oak Knoll Naval Hospital in Oakland, California. According to the Church,

Scientology accounts do not mention Hubbard's involvement in occultism. He is instead described as "continu[ing] to write to help support his research" during this period into "the development of a means to better the condition of man". The Church of Scientology has nonetheless acknowledged Hubbard's involvement with the OTO; a 1969 statement, written by Hubbard himself, said:

The Church of Scientology says Hubbard was "sent in" by his fellow science fiction author Robert Heinlein, "who was running off-book intelligence operations for naval intelligence at the time". However, Heinlein's authorized biographer has said that he looked into the matter at the suggestion of Scientologists but found nothing to corroborate claims that Heinlein had been involved, and his biography of Heinlein makes no mention of the matter.

The Church of Scientology says Hubbard quit the Navy because it "attempted to monopolize all his researches and force him to work on a project 'to make man more suggestible' and when he was unwilling, tried to blackmail him by ordering him back to active duty to perform this function. Having many friends he was able to instantly resign from the Navy and escape this trap." The Navy said in a statement in 1980: "There is no evidence on record of an attempt to recall him to active duty."

Following Hubbard's death, Bridge Publications published several stand-alone biographical accounts of his life. Marco Frenschkowski notes that "non-Scientologist readers immediately recognize some parts of Hubbard's life are here systematically left out: no information whatsoever is given about his private life (his marriages, divorces, children), his legal affairs and so on." The Church maintains an extensive website presenting the official version of Hubbard's life. It also owns a number of properties dedicated to Hubbard including the Los Angeles-based L. Ron Hubbard Life Exhibition (a presentation of Hubbard's life), the Author Services Center (a presentation of Hubbard's writings), and the L. Ron Hubbard House in Washington, D.C.

In late 2012, Bridge published a comprehensive official biography of Hubbard, titled The L. Ron Hubbard Series: A Biographical Encyclopedia, written primarily by Dan Sherman, the official Hubbard biographer at the time. This most recent official Church of Scientology biography of Hubbard is a 17 volume series, with each volume focusing on a different aspect of Hubbard's life, including his music, photography, geographic exploration, humanitarian work, and nautical career. It is advertised as a "Biographic Encyclopedia" and is primarily authored by the official biographer, Dan Sherman.

During his lifetime, a number of brief biographical sketches were also published in his Scientology books. The Church of Scientology issued "the only authorized LRH Biography" in October 1977 (it has since been followed by the Sherman "Biographic Encyclopedia"). His life was illustrated in print in What Is Scientology?, a glossy publication published in 1978, with paintings of Hubbard's life contributed by his son Arthur.

Bibliography

According to the Church of Scientology, Hubbard produced some 65 million words on Dianetics and Scientology, contained in about 500,000 pages of written material, 3,000 recorded lectures and 100 films. His works of fiction included some 500 novels and short stories.

See also 

 Aleister Crowley
 Norton S. Karno, an attorney for the Church of Scientology and for L. Ron Hubbard
 Timeline of L. Ron Hubbard

References

General and cited references 

 
 Behar, Richard Pushing Beyond the U.S.: Scientology makes its presence felt in Europe and Canada
 Bromley, David G. "Making Sense of Scientology: Prophetic, Contractual Religion", in Lewis, James R. (ed.), Scientology. Oxford: Oxford University Press, 2009.  
 Christensen, Dorthe Refslund. "Inventing L. Ron Hubbard: On the Construction and Maintenance of the Hagiographic Mythology of Scientology's Founder," pp. 227–258 in Lewis, James R.; Petersen, Jesper Aagaard: Controversial new religions. Oxford: Oxford University Press, 2005.
 Evans, Christopher. Cults of Unreason. New York: Farrar, Straus and Giroux, 1974. , 
 Gardner, Martin. Fads and fallacies in the name of science. New York: Courier Dover Publications, 1957. , 
 Jacobsen, Jeff Day, Robert RJ. What the Church of Scientology Doesn't Want You To Know.
 Lamont, Stewart. Religion Inc.: The Church of Scientology. London: Harrap, 1986. , 
 Malko, George. Scientology: The Now Religion. New York: Delacorte Press, 1970. 
 Melton, J. Gordon. Encyclopedic handbook of cults in America. Taylor & Francis; 1992. 
 
 O'Brien, Helen. Dianetics in Limbo: A Documentary About Immortality. Philadelphia: Whitmore Publishing, 1966. 
 Pendle, George. Strange Angel: The Otherworldly Life of Rocket Scientist John Whiteside Parsons. Orlando, FL: Houghton Mifflin Harcourt, 2006. , 
 Rolph, Cecil Hewitt Believe What You Like: what happened between the Scientologists and the National Association for Mental Health. London: Deutsch, 1973. , 
 Rothstein, Mikael. "Scientology, scripture and sacred traditions," in Lewis, James R.; Hammer, Olav (eds.): The invention of sacred tradition. Cambridge: Cambridge University Press, 2007. , 
 
 Streissguth, Thomas. Charismatic cult leaders. Minneapolis: The Oliver Press, 1995. , 
 Tucker, Ruth A. Another Gospel: Cults, Alternative Religions, and the New Age Movement. Grand Rapids, MI: Zondervan, 2004. , 
 Wallis, Roy. The road to total freedom: a sociological analysis of Scientology. New York: Columbia University Press, 1977. , 
 Whitehead, Harriet. Renunciation and reformulation: a study of conversion in an American sect. Ithaca, NY: Cornell University Press, 1987. , 
 
 Wright, Lawrence. Going Clear: Scientology, Hollywood, and the Prison of Belief. New York: Vintage Books, 2013.

External links

 
 Biographical documentation from The New Yorker
 Operation Clambake. Critical material on Hubbard and Scientology
 U.S. Government FBI Files for Hubbard via The Smoking Gun
 Frenschkowski, Marco, "L. Ron Hubbard and Scientology: An annotated bibliographical survey of primary and selected secondary literature", Marburg Journal of Religion, Vol. 1. No. 1. July 1999, 
 
 
 Hubbard, L Ron at The Encyclopedia of Science Fiction
 Hubbard, L Ron  at the Encyclopedia of Fantasy

 
1911 births
1986 deaths
20th-century American criminals
20th-century American male musicians
20th-century American novelists
20th-century American poets
20th-century male musicians
20th-century pseudonymous writers
American conspiracy theorists
American expatriates in Greece
American expatriates in Rhodesia
American expatriates in the United Kingdom
American experimental musicians
American fantasy writers
American male non-fiction writers
American male novelists
American male poets
American occultists
American people convicted of fraud
American people convicted of theft
American psychological fiction writers
American religious leaders
American religious writers
American science fiction writers
American Scientologists
American self-help writers
American spiritual writers
Angelic visionaries
Anti-psychiatry
Ceremonial magicians
Cult leaders
Founders of new religious movements
Fugitives
George Washington University School of Engineering and Applied Science alumni
History of religion in the United States
L. Ron Hubbard family
Military personnel from Nebraska
Musicians from California
People from Bay Head, New Jersey
People from Helena, Montana
People from Tilden, Nebraska
Pulp fiction writers
Scientology officials
United States Marine Corps reservists
United States Navy officers
United States Navy personnel of World War II
Western (genre) writers
Writers from California
Writers from Nebraska